A Stolen Life is a 1946 American drama film starring Bette Davis, who also produced it. The film, based on the 1935 novel A Stolen Life by Karel Josef Benes, was directed by Curtis Bernhardt. Among the supporting cast are Glenn Ford, Dane Clark, Peggy Knudsen, Charlie Ruggles, and Bruce Bennett. It is a remake of the 1939 British film Stolen Life starring Elisabeth Bergner and Michael Redgrave.

It was nominated for Best Special Effects (William C. McGann; Special Audible Effects by Nathan Levinson) at the 19th Academy Awards, but lost to Blithe Spirit.

The second time Davis played twin sisters was in Dead Ringer (1964).

Plot
Kate Bosworth (Bette Davis) is a sincere, demure artist who misses her boat to an island off New England, where she intends to meet her twin sister Patricia (also Davis) and her cousin Freddie (Charlie Ruggles). She persuades Bill Emerson (Glenn Ford) to take her home in his boat. Later, their relationship grows while she paints a portrait of Eben Folger (Walter Brennan), the old lighthouse keeper, and Kate falls very much in love.

Her sister Pat, a flamboyant, man-hungry manipulator, fools Bill when she first meets him by pretending to be Kate. Pat then pursues him on a trip out of town, and when they return, they announce to Kate their intention to marry.

A heartbroken Kate focuses on her work with a rude but very talented artist named Karnock (Dane Clark), but rejects his romantic overtures. Bill eventually goes to Chile, allowing Kate to spend some time with her sister, whom she hasn't seen since the marriage. When the two go sailing, a sudden storm washes Pat overboard and she drowns, her sister inadvertently seizing her wedding ring while trying to save her. Kate passes out and is washed ashore in the boat. When she regains consciousness, she is mistaken for Pat.

Bill is about to return, so Kate decides to assume her late sister's identity. To her surprise, she learns that Bill is angry at Pat for her many affairs and in no mood to continue the marriage. Cousin Freddie has guessed the truth and insists that Kate must reveal to Bill her real identity. When she does, Bill realizes that Kate is the one he truly loves.

Cast
 Bette Davis as Kate and Patricia Bosworth
 Glenn Ford as Bill Emerson
 Dane Clark as Karnock
 Walter Brennan as Eben Folger
 Charlie Ruggles as Freddie Linley
 Bruce Bennett as Jack R. Talbot
 Peggy Knudsen as Diedre
 Esther Dale as Mrs. Johnson
 Clara Blandick as Martha
 Joan Winfield as Lucy
 Jack Mower as George (uncredited)
 Leo White as Waiter (uncredited)

Box office
According to Warner Bros. records, the film earned $3,222,000 domestically and $1,563,000 foreign.

References

External links

 
 
 
 

1946 drama films
1946 films
American drama films
American black-and-white films
American remakes of British films
Films scored by Max Steiner
Films directed by Curtis Bernhardt
Films set in Massachusetts
Films about twin sisters
Warner Bros. films
1940s English-language films
1940s American films